Kerry Mondragon is an independent filmmaker and screenwriter and director of the feature film Tyger Tyger, featuring Dylan Sprouse, Sam Quartin, Thea Sophie Loch Naess, and Eden Brolin.

Tyger Tyger 
Tyger Tyger, Mondragon's debut feature film, was released in select theaters and digital on-demand on February 26, 2021 and received mixed reviews. Tyger Tyger, partly aimed at the youth audience, notably was ranked #16 on Seventeen Magazine's 25 Best Movies of 2021.

Personal life 
Mondragon was born on July 9, 1984 in Tucson, Arizona. He was mentored in film direction by Spike Lee while serving as Lee's Assistant and Associate Producer during the filming of the latter's Da Sweet Blood of Jesus (2014).

Influences 
Mondragon cites Jean Vigo and Rainer Werner Fassbinder as influences.

Current Work 
Mondragon is currently in post-production on his second feature film as screenwriter-director, Wetiko, starring Juan Daniel Garcia Trevino, Dalia Xiuhcoatl, Neil Sandilands, Barbara de Reigl, and Jordan Barrett. This film's theme revolves around the odyssey of a young Maya man who is navigating his way through the treacherous undercurrents of a shady New Age ecovillage in the Yucatán. It features dialogue in English, Spanish, Maya, Afrikaans, and one fictional language. Wetiko will premiere as an official selection of the New Orleans Film Festival in November 2022. The European premier of Wetiko will be at the Stockholm Film Festival on November 9, 2022.

References 
 Leslie Felperin of The Guardian commented that, "(T)he film-makers are lucky poor old William Blake's work is out of copyright, otherwise his heirs (were any to be found) would have a good reason to sue." 
 "Tyger Tyger (2021)". Rotten Tomatoes. Retrieved 2021-12-01.
 Costa, Roger (2021-02-24). "A Pandemic Psychedelic Road Trip Scarily Timely". Brazilian Press (in Brazilian Portuguese). Retrieved 2021-04-01.
 Leslie Felperin (2021-06-21). "Tyger Tyger review – spaced-out apocalypse chic in pandemic thriller". The Guardian. Retrieved 2021-08-09.
 Beresford, Trilby (February 26, 2021). "Dylan Sprouse on How Thriller 'Tyger Tyger' Offers a Different Picture of Drug Addiction". The Hollywood Reporter.
 Da Sweet Blood of Jesus (2014) - IMDb, retrieved 2022-04-24
 DeS, Naceers (2021-06-17). "Tyger Tyger - Interview with Filmmaker Kerry Mondragon". Borrowing Tape. Retrieved 2022-04-24
 Mondragon, Kerry, Wetiko (Adventure, Fantasy), Uninflected Pictures, retrieved 2022-04-24

References

1984 births

Living people